The National Film Award – Special Mention (Feature Film) is a certificate of merit presented by the Directorate of Film Festivals, the organisation set up by Ministry of Information and Broadcasting, India. It is one of several honours presented for feature films. The recipients of Special Mention are presented with a certificate of merit, without any trophies or cash prizes.

The certificate was instituted in 1978, at 26th National Film Awards and awarded for films produced in a given year across the country, in all Indian languages.

Winners

See also 
 National Film Award – Special Jury Award

References

External links 
 Official Page for Directorate of Film Festivals, India
 National Film Awards Archives
 National Film Awards at IMDb

Special Mention (feature film)